Anthony Gill may refer to:

Anthony Gill (basketball) (born 1992), American basketball player
Anthony Gill (political scientist) (born 1965), American political scientist
Anthony Gill (professor) (born 1972), Australian pathologist and medical researcher
A. A. Gill (Adrian Anthony Gill, 1954–2016), British writer and critic
Tony Gill (born 1968), English footballer